Valea Dragului is a commune located in Giurgiu County, Muntenia, Romania. It is composed of a single village, Valea Dragului. The former villages of Ciocoveni and Ghimpați were merged with Valea Dragului in 1968.

Natives
 Ion Voinescu

References

Communes in Giurgiu County
Localities in Muntenia